id - Identity of the Soul is a work of performance art produced by 
Martine Rød and directed by Thomas Hoegh. The first version of this work, Terje, was performed in Yokohama, Japan in 2006 with Paal Ritter Schjerven as Co-Director and Director of Cinematography. 
and the latest version premiered in Palestine in 2008.  In 2009 the show then toured to Doha, Qatar in May and to the Teater Ibsen in Skien, Norway in June.  The Studio version of id (a smaller, more portable version of the production) had its English premiere at the Cambridge Film Festival on 17 September 2009 and is currently touring the UK.

Based on Norwegian playwright Henrik Ibsen's poem 'Terje Vigen' 
and Palestinian poet Mahmoud Darwish's "A Soldier 
Dreams of White Lilies" 
id is a combination of music and poetry along
with film projected onto five separate screens. The 
soundtrack was composed by Paul Noble and Dan Berridge, and is a fusion 
of traditional Scandinavian and Arabic music with contemporary 
electronic 
rhythms.

World Tour
id has been performed in several cities since 2006, and continues its world and UK tour

References

External links
 Film Maker Website
 Arts Alliance
 Mahmoud Darwish's Website
 id - Identity of the Soul Website
 id - Identity of the Soul local Website
 Varden Newspaper Telemark Norway
 Qatar Tribune's review of "id - Identity of the Soul"
 Report from Aman in Norwegian daily - Aftenposten
 The Official Cambridge Film Festival Website
 From Banipal Magazine of Modern Arab Literature
 Review from Cambridge Film Festival

Performances
Adaptations of works by Henrik Ibsen